Jake Clemons (born February 27, 1980) is an American musician, singer and songwriter. Since 2012, he has been the saxophonist for Bruce Springsteen's E Street Band, after the death of the band's original saxophonist, his uncle Clarence Clemons. Clemons has performed various instruments including percussion and backing vocals on Springsteen's Wrecking Ball Tour, High Hopes Tour and The River Tour. Clemons attended the Virginia Governor's School for the Arts to study jazz performance. Clemons also has performed with Eddie Vedder, Roger Waters, The Swell Season and The Roots.

Clemons released a solo album titled Fear & Love in January 2017.

Tours with Jake Clemons Band 
 Ireland, England, Scotland – Oct – Nov 2014
Australia –  2014
 Australia – March 2015
 Ireland/ Canada – Spring 2017
 Ireland/UK – Fall 2017
 Summer Road Trip – Canada, USA, UK – 2018

Tours with Bruce Springsteen and the E Street Band 
 Wrecking Ball World Tour (2012–2013)
 High Hopes Tour (2014)
 The River Tour 2016 (2016)
 Australia & New Zealand Summer Tour (2017), billed as Summer 17.
 Springsteen and E Street Band 2023 Tour (2023)

References

External links 

 

1980 births
Living people
African-American rock musicians
American saxophonists
American male saxophonists
E Street Band members
21st-century saxophonists